= Coocheyville, Virginia =

Unincorporated community in Virginia, United States

Coordinates: 37°38′51″N 75°51′08″W

Coocheyville is an unincorporated community in Accomack County, Virginia, United States.

In 1998, the community was reported to consist of five homes, two of which were unoccupied. A store and blacksmith's shop were formerly operated in the area. The community's name may be derived from the former presence of prostitutes in the community.
